Nicolas Prattes Bittencourt Pires (born 4 May 1997) is a Brazilian actor.

Career
He started his acting career at the age of 10. At the age of 13 he played small roles in theatrical performances in Rio de Janeiro. He also studied at the New York Film Academy in Los Angeles, California.

In 2015 he debuted on television as the protagonist of the 23rd season of Malhação.

Filmography

Television

Film

Theater

Awards & Nominations

References

External links 

 
 

1997 births
Living people
Male actors from Rio de Janeiro (city)
Brazilian male television actors
Brazilian male film actors
Brazilian male stage actors
New York Film Academy alumni
21st-century Brazilian male actors